Piskunov is a Russian masculine surname, its feminine counterpart is Piskunova. It may refer to
Anatoli Piskunov (born 1949), Russian football player
Anton Piskunov (disambiguation)
Dmitri Piskunov (born 1969), Russian football coach and former player
Nikolai Piskunov (1908-1977), Russian mathematician
Sergei Piskunov (born 1981), Russian ice hockey winger
Vladyslav Piskunov (born 1978), Ukrainian hammer thrower
Yelena Piskunova (born 1980), Uzbekistani sprinter

See also
 9056 Piskunov, a minor planet named after Nikolai Piskunov

Russian-language surnames